Yaron Peled (born May 23, 1969) is an Israeli producer and entrepreneur.

Personal life
Peled graduated from the Herzliya Hebrew Gymnasium and served in the Israeli air force.
He is the son of Miki Peled, one of Israel's most notable Impresarios. He is married with two kids and lives in Hofit.

Entertainment and media
Since 2003 Peled has been a partner in Solan Hafakot, the company producing the Festigal - a well known annual Israeli song and dance show for children starring some of the country's most notable performers.

As part of his private company, Footprint investments, Peled helped produce local version of famous musical Billy Elliot the Musical starring Avi Kushnir and Dafna Dekel and bring to Israel Priscilla, Queen of the Desert (musical), both planned for the summer of 2016. His company will be bringing American stand-up comedian Kenny Kramer, the inspiration for the character of Cosmo Kramer from the television sitcom Seinfeld in March 2016 and was also involved in bringing to Israel the works of the Spanish surrealist painter Salvador Dalí for an exhibition that will open in Tel Aviv in April 2016.

Renewable energy projects
Peled has also been involved in renewable energy projects in Israel through his investments in Solarfarm, a company specializing in biogas and Anaerobic Digestion systems for agriculture uses with over 10MW planned for installment between 2017 and 2019.

References

External links 
 45 million dollar production - the numbers behind the festigal (Globes) 

Living people
1969 births
Herzliya Hebrew Gymnasium alumni
Israeli businesspeople
Israeli producers
Israeli Jews
Israeli Air Force personnel
People from Central District (Israel)